Live at the Purple Onion is the first special and DVD by American stand-up comedian Zach Galifianakis directed by Michael Blieden. The show was recorded at the San Francisco club The Purple Onion in June 2005.

Synopsis 
Galifianakis's routine features his trademark dry humor and a large portion of it is accompanied by a light piano piece played by him as bed music. It ends with him tearing off pages of a large pad of paper which contain pre-written, and largely self-deprecating, jokes, while the Pacific Boychoir sings "The Greatest Love of All". The DVD contains two separate sections which are cut to throughout the routine, often at times where the content of the routine may have to do with the content of the other portions. One of the sections is an unscripted roadtrip to The Purple Onion in a Volkswagen Bus with Galifianakis and his friend Joe Wagner. The banter and happenings that occur seem to provide insights to where Galifianakis gets some of his comedy. The bus ends up breaking down just short of their goal so they finish the trip in a GoCar, a small rental vehicle meant for tourists. The second section is a loosely scripted interview of Galifianakis's brother "Seth Galifianakis" (played by Galifianakis) by Brian Unger.

External links 
 

Stand-up comedy concert films
2006 television specials
2007 video albums
Netflix specials
Funny or Die
Shout! Factory video albums
Stand-up comedy on DVD
2000s in comedy
2000s English-language films